Santa Ana del Yacuma (also Santa Ana) is a town in the Beni Department in north-eastern Bolivia.

History
The Jesuit mission of Santa Ana was founded in 1719. Movima Indians resided at the mission.

Location
Santa Ana is the capital of the Yacuma Province and the Santa Ana del Yacuma Municipality, located at an elevation of 144 m above sea level, where the Yacuma River meets the Mamoré River. Santa Ana is located 150 Kilometer north-west of Trinidad, the department's capital.
The city has an Airport, the Santa Ana del Yacuma Airport, which is located just outside the city.

Population
The town population has decreased from 14,788 (census 1992) to 12,944 (census 2001) and 12,783 (2008 estimate).

Climate 
The yearly precipitation of the region is 1,700 mm, with a distinct dry season from May to September. Monthly average temperatures vary from 24 °C und 29 °C over the year. According to the Köppen classification system Santa Ana del Yacuma has a Tropical savanna climate, abbreviated "Aw", bordering on a Tropical monsoon climate.

Notable residents
Saul Farrah, boxer
Roberto Suarez Gomez, drug lord

References

External links

Populated places in Beni Department
Jesuit Missions of Moxos

it:Santa Ana del Yacuma